In 1969, Norwegian Bjørn Wirkola became the first person to win the Four Hills Tournament three times in a row. He was the fifth athlete to win the first three events, but yet again the 'Grand Slam' was denied, this time by Wirkola's closest rival Jiří Raška. It was a disappointing tournament for the two host nations with the best athlete from either being Reinhold Bachler, finishing 11th overall.

Participating nations and athletes

For the first time in seven years, no non-European nations participated. The national groups of Germany and Austria only competed at the two events in their respective countries.

Results

Oberstdorf
 Schattenbergschanze, Oberstdorf
29 December 1968

Garmisch-Partenkirchen
 Große Olympiaschanze, Garmisch-Partenkirchen
1 January 1969

Innsbruck
 Bergiselschanze, Innsbruck
4 December 1969

Bischofshofen
 Paul-Ausserleitner-Schanze, Bischofshofen
5 January 1969

Final ranking

References

External links
 FIS website
 Four Hills Tournament web site

Four Hills Tournament
1968 in ski jumping
1969 in ski jumping